Footvolley competition at the 2014 Asian Beach Games was held in Phuket, Thailand from 14 to 15 November 2014 at Patong Beach.

Medalists

Results

Preliminary

Pool A

Pool B

Knockout round
15 November

References

External links 
 Official website

2014 Asian Beach Games events